Diamond Schmitt Architects is a Canadian architectural firm founded in 1975. It is headquartered in Toronto, Ontario. The firm was founded by architects Jack Diamond and Donald Schmitt.

History 
In 1964, Jack Diamond was the Founding Director of the University of Toronto's Master of Architecture program. Diamond worked closely with Barton Myers, an American and Canadian architect, and is currently the president of Barton Myers Associates Inc. Myers established his own practice with Diamond in Toronto in 1968. Starting this year, the architects founded their new firm Diamond and Myers. The two eventually split in 1975. Diamond Schmitt Architecture would not officially begin until 1974 when Jack Diamond established his own firm, A.J Diamond Architects.

It was around this time that the partnership between Jack Diamond and Donald Schmitt began. Schmitt studied architecture at the University of Toronto where Diamond had worked, continuing his education until 1978. After thirteen years of A.J. Diamond Architects, in 1989, the firm had developed further when Jack Diamond partnered with Schmitt.

Founding 

Abel Joseph "Jack" Diamond was born in 1932 in South Africa, and had arrived in Canada in 1964, the same year he started working for the University of Toronto. In 1970, Diamond had begun renovating a ceramics manufacturing plant, and adding living spaces on one of the floors. Five years later, Diamond established his company A.J Diamond architects, and three years later he would form his partnership with Donald Schmitt and Company.

Donald Schmitt was born 1951 in South Porcupine, a small mining town in northern Ontario. He went to high school at the University of Toronto Schools (UTS) and studied afterwards at the University of Toronto Faculty of Architecture.

Apart from the firm's founding principals, there are also 19 other principals, 12 senior associates, 37 associates, 8 directors, 129 registered graduates and student architects, and a support staff of 43.

Work in progress
David Geffen Hall, New York City
Robarts Library Revitalization, University of Toronto
Obzor Luxury Beach & Spa, Black Sea Residential Resorts, Obzor, Bulgaria (with Urbiarch, Obzor)
 Buddy Holly Hall of Performing Arts and Sciences, Lubbock, Texas
Lethbridge Crossings Leisure Complex, Lethbridge, Alberta
Medicine Hat Regional Hospital Redevelopment, Medicine Hat, Alberta

Awards

Diamond Schmitt Architects has received numerous regional, national and international awards for excellence in design. The firm was recognized in 2009 by Deloitte LLP, the Canadian Imperial Bank of Commerce, KPMG, and the Queen’s University School of Business as being one of the 50 Best Managed Companies in Canada.

Canadian Governor General’s Awards for Architecture
Village Terrace, Toronto, Ontario, 1985
Citadel Theatre, Edmonton, Alberta, 1986
Metro Toronto YMCA, Toronto, Ontario, 1986
Earth Sciences Centre, University of Toronto, Toronto, Ontario, 1994
Richmond Hill Central Library, Richmond Hill, Ontario, 1994
York University Student Centre, Toronto, Ontario, 1996
Bridgepoint Hospital, Toronto, Ontario 2016

Ontario Architect's Association Awards

2020: Senate of Canada Building in joint Venture with KWC Architects Inc
2007:  Four Seasons Centre for the Performing Arts

BusinessWeek/Architectural Record Awards
2004: Israeli Ministry of Foreign Affairs, Jerusalem, Israel
2007: The Four Seasons Center for the Performing Arts, Toronto, Ontario, Canada
2008: Shakespeare Theatre at the Harman Center for the Arts, Washington, D.C., USA

References

External links

Architecture firms of Canada
Companies based in Toronto
1975 establishments in Ontario